Daniel Denison may refer to:

 Daniel Denison (golfer) (born 1985), English golfer
 Daniel Denison (colonist) (1612–1682), early settler and political and military leader of the Massachusetts Bay Colony
 Daniel R. Denison, professor of organization and management